Deborah Hurst is a former New Zealand gymnast. She won a bronze medal representing her country—alongside Kirsty Durward, Rowena Davis and Lynette Brake—in the women's all-around team event at the 1978 Commonwealth Games. Also at those games, she finished eighth in the women's individual all-round.

References

Year of birth missing (living people)
Living people
New Zealand female artistic gymnasts
Commonwealth Games bronze medallists for New Zealand
Gymnasts at the 1978 Commonwealth Games
Commonwealth Games medallists in gymnastics
20th-century New Zealand women
Medallists at the 1978 Commonwealth Games